Gary Keith Mize (April 29, 1961 – November 23, 2002), better known by his ring name Billy Travis or Billy Joe Travis, was an American professional wrestler. He is most known for his time in Continental Wrestling Association (CWA) and the United States Wrestling Association (USWA) holding several tag team championships over the years.

Professional wrestling career
Mize grew up watching wrestling and was trained by MWA Championship Wrestling owner and promoter Dale Mann for his professional wrestling career and began working for MWA in 1981 as a face (wrestling term for those that portray the "good guys") known as Billy Travis. When wrestling under the Billy Travis moniker, he teamed up with Mike Mann, forming a tag team known collectively as the Southern Sensations, a team that won the MWA Tag Team Championship.

In 1984 he began working in the Memphis, Tennessee area for the Continental Wrestling Association (CWA) and later on worked for the World Wrestling Federation, both places gaining experience while losing to established stars. In 1985 he returned to the CWA, working as "Billy Joe Travis", adopting a conceited, egotistical heel ("bad guy") ring character. Travis teamed up with Ron Sexton to form a team known as "Hot Property", the young duo was paired up with veteran Buddy Wayne to act as their manager. Travis also briefly teamed with Norvell Austin during the summer of 1985 as he worked a storyline feud with The Fabulous Ones (Stan Lane and Steve Keirn). In 1986 he started working as a singles wrestler for Texas USA All-Star Wrestling, working storylines opposite Al Madril, Lord Jonathon Boyd and Big Bubba.

In 1987 Travis returned to Memphis, this time with Frank Morell as his mentor. During his stint in the CWA he teamed with another young wrestler, Jeff Jarrett forming a very popular team that won the AWA Southern Tag Team Championship three times. He would also win the International Championship from Austin Idol and worked an extended storyline against Phil Hickerson. Travis and a rookie Scott Steiner won the CWA Tag Team Championship twice. Travis would suffer from drug abuse around this time, which ruined his professional reputation, but he continued to work in several smaller promotions. He gained notoriety in 1997 while working for the USWA, where he was arrested when his ex wife was reportedly seeking overdue child support payments and had tipped off Memphis police that Travis would be on location for saturday tapings at the WMC TV studios in Memphis. Police took this tip seriously and were actually on the scene when Travis arrived. This arrest was enough for Jerry Lawler, the booker, to turn this arrest into a storyline. Travis continued wrestling after this incident, but never experienced break-out success. He retired in 1999. 

In 2001, he returned to wrestling and had his last match on July 26, 2002 losing to Jerry Lawler.

Personal life
Mize graduated from Madison Central High School in 1979. His mother was Bonnie Todd, who worked for Eastern Kentucky University, and his stepfather was Walter Todd, part owner of a local funeral home in Richmond, Kentucky.

Death
Mize died of an apparent heart attack on November 23, 2002, shortly after arriving at his mother's home in Kentucky; attempts by paramedics to revive him were unsuccessful.

Championships and accomplishments 
Americas Wrestling Federation (Puerto Rico)
AWF Junior Heavyweight Championship (2 times)
Continental Wrestling Association
AWA Southern Tag Team Championship (4 times) – with Jeff Jarrett (3) and Mark Starr (1)
CWA Tag Team Championship (3 times) – with Scott Steiner (2) and Action Jackson (1)
Mountain Wrestling Association
MWA Tag Team Championship (3 times) – with Michael Ray
Power Pro Wrestling
PPW Tag Team Championship (1 time) – with Bulldog Raines
Pro Wrestling Illustrated
PWI ranked Billy Travis # 139 of the 500 best singles wrestlers of the PWI 500 in 1993
United States Wrestling Association
USWA Southern Heavyweight Championship (1 time)
USWA World Tag Team Championship (2 times) – with Flash Flanagan (2)
World Wrestling Council
WWC Junior Heavyweight Championship (1 time)
WWC World Tag Team Championship (1 time) – with El Gran Mendoza
Texas All-Star Wrestling
Texas All-Star USA Heavyweight Championship (1 time)

See also
 List of premature professional wrestling deaths

References

External links
Billy Travis at Cagematch.net
Billy Travis at Genickbruch.com
Billy Travis at Johnny O's Wrestling Website
Professional wrestling record for Billy Travis from The Internet Wrestling Database

1961 births
2002 deaths
American male professional wrestlers
Sportspeople from Lexington, Kentucky
USWA World Tag Team Champions
AWA International Heavyweight Champions
20th-century professional wrestlers
21st-century professional wrestlers